The NOAA Corps Commendation Medal is an honorary recognition awarded to members of the NOAA Commissioned Officer Corps or to members of the Uniformed Services detailed, assigned, or attached to NOAA.

Award criteria
The NOAA Corps Commendation Medal is awarded for:
Recognition of acts of heroism worthy of special recognition, but not to the degree required for the Department of Commerce Gold or Silver Medals.
Outstanding service or achievement worthy of special recognition, but not to the degree required for the Department of Commerce Bronze Medal or NOAA Corps Meritorious Service Medal.
Leadership meriting special recognition.

Appearance
Subsequent awards are denoted by a gold 5/16 inch star worn on the medal suspension ribbon and service ribbon.

References

Awards and decorations of the National Oceanic and Atmospheric Administration